Wolf is the third studio album by musician Trevor Rabin, released in 1981 through Chrysalis Records.

Track listing

Personnel
Trevor Rabin - vocals, guitar, bass, keyboards
Jack Bruce - bass
Mo Foster - bass
Manfred Mann - keyboards
John "Rabbit" Bundrick - keyboards
Chris Thompson - vocals
Stevie Lange - vocals
Noel McCalla - vocals
Simon Phillips - drums
Technical
Ray Davies - associate producer
Ben Fenner - engineer
Peter Wagg - art direction
Brian Cooke - photography

References

1981 albums
Trevor Rabin albums
Albums produced by Trevor Rabin
Chrysalis Records albums